The Warndarrang people,  (waɳʈaraŋ), also spelt Warndarang, Wanderang, and other variants were a predominantly coastal Aboriginal Australian people of eastern Northern Territory. Though extinct as a distinct ethnolinguistic group, their descendants survive among the neighbouring Nunggubuyu.

Language
Warndarang has been classified as a member of the Gunwinyguan language group. Though thought to be extinct by 1974, some sources state that a fluent speaker was interviewed in 1989 and provided significant amounts of oral text in the language, together with a translation into Kriol.

Country
To their north were the Nunggubuyu while their western borders reached inland, eastwards to the Ngandi territories between the Walker and Rose rivers.

History
In 1903 the Eastern and African Cold Storage Company purchased the Hodgson Downs cattle station and other tribal lands, and embarked on a policy of systematic extermination of all Aboriginal people residing on the land which the company directors wished to turn into a pastoral empire. Hunting gangs consisting of 10-14 Aboriginal (though not local) men, armed and under the supervision of a white or "half-caste" foreman, were commissioned to clear the land by shooting any Aboriginal person on sight. When the Church of England established the Roper River Mission in 1908, the remnants of the Warndarang, together with survivors of other local clans of peoples such as the Alawa, Marra, Ngalakgan, Ngandi, and the southern clans of the Rembarrnga and Nunggubuyu gathered there for sanctuary from the onslaught. Eventually several clans of the Warndarung were assimilated by the Nunggubuyu by adopting their language.

Notes

Citations

Sources

Aboriginal peoples of the Northern Territory